Juventus finished in 4th place in the league this season, but won the Coppa Italia and the UEFA Cup.

Squad

Goalkeepers
  Stefano Tacconi
  Adriano Bonaiuti
  Davide Micillo

Defenders
  Luigi De Agostini
  Dario Bonetti
  Nicolò Napoli
  Pasquale Bruno
  Roberto Tricella
  Sergio Brio (C)
  Massimiliano Rosa
  Michele Serena

Midfielders
  Giancarlo Marocchi
  Sergei Aleinikov
  Roberto Galia
  Oleksandr Zavarov
  Angelo Alessio
  Daniele Fortunato
  Salvatore Avallone

Attackers
  Salvatore Schillaci
  Pierluigi Casiraghi
  Rui Barros
  Federico Giampaolo

Competitions

Serie A

League table

Matches

Topscorers
.-Salvatore Schillaci-15
.-Luigi De Agostini-5
.-Giancarlo Marocchi-5
.-Oleksandr Zavarov-5
.-Pierluigi Casiraghi-4
.-Sergei Aleinikov-3

Coppa Italia 

First round

Second round

Group phase

Semifinals

Final

UEFA Cup

First round

Second round

Third round

Quarterfinals

Semifinals

Final

References

Juventus F.C. seasons
Juventus
UEFA Europa League-winning seasons